S v Mamabolo is a case in which the Constitutional Court of South Africa dealt with the relationship between contempt of court and freedom of speech. The court held that a person could only be convicted of "scandalising the court" for a statement made outside of the court if that statement "really was likely to damage the administration of justice". The court also held that the procedure applied in the High Court for prosecution of the offence, whereby the judge could summon the accused, question him and summarily convict him of contempt, was an unjustifiable violation of the right to a fair trial.

References

External links
 Text of the judgment

South African criminal case law
Constitutional Court of South Africa cases
2001 in case law
2001 in South African law
Free speech case law